The Sexual Offences Act 1956 (4 & 5 Eliz.2 c.69) is an Act of the Parliament of the United Kingdom that consolidated the English criminal law relating to sexual offences between 1957 and 2004. It was mostly repealed (from 1 May 2004) by the Sexual Offences Act 2003 which replaced it, but sections 33 to 37 still survive. The 2003 Act also added a new section 33A. These sections create offences to deal with brothels.

Although the rest of the Act has been repealed, the repealed sections still apply to sex crimes committed before the repeal, such as in the Pitcairn sexual assault trial of 2004.

The Act today
Sections 33, 34, 35 and 36 create summary offences. Section 33A creates an aggravated version of the offence in section 33, and is an indictable offence. Section 37 prescribes the penalties.

Sections 33 and 33A
Section 33 reads:

Section 33A reads:

The difference between these offences arises because the definition of a brothel in English law does not require that the premises are used for the purposes of prostitution, since a brothel exists wherever more than one person offers sexual contact, whether for payment or not.

"Prostitution" is defined by section 51(2) of the Sexual Offences Act 2003 as follows:

"Payment" is defined by section 51(3):

Section 34

Section 35(1)

Section 36

Penalties
Section 37 gives effect to Schedule 2 to the Act, which sets out the penalties for the above offences. For sections 33, 34, 35 and 36 the penalty is imprisonment for three months for a first offence, or six months "for an offence committed after a previous conviction" for any of those offences.

The maximum sentence for the offence under section 33A is six months in a magistrates' court, or seven years in the Crown Court.

Succeeding Sexual Offences Acts
The Street Offences Act 1959 prohibited soliciting "in a street or public place for the purpose of prostitution."
The Sexual Offences Act 1985 prohibited kerb crawling and persistently soliciting women for the purposes of prostitution.
The Sexual Offences Act 2003 inserted section 33A into the 1956 Act,  and created further offences relating to prostitution: 
Sections 47 to 50 prohibit child prostitution.
Sections 52 and 53 prohibit pimping for financial gain.
Sections 57 to 59 create offences relating to sex trafficking.

The Act as originally enacted

Comparative table
Section 2 replaced section 3(1) of the Criminal Law Amendment Act 1885

Section 3 replaced section 3(2) of the Criminal Law Amendment Act 1885 and section 36 of the Criminal Law Amendment Act 1951

Section 4 replaced section 3(3) of the Criminal Law Amendment Act 1885

Section 5 replaced section 4 of the Criminal Law Amendment Act 1885

Section 6(1) replaced section 5(1) of the Criminal Law Amendment Act 1885

Section 6(2) replaced section 1 of the Age of Marriage Act 1929

Section 6(3) replaced section 2 of the Criminal Law Amendment Act 1922

Section 7 replaced section 5(2) of the Criminal Law Amendment Act 1885

Section 8 replaced section 56(1)(a) of the Mental Deficiency Act 1913

Section 9 replaced section 56(1)(b) of the Mental Deficiency Act 1913

Section 10(1) replaced section 1(1) to (3) of the Punishment of Incest Act 1908

Section 10(2) replaced section 3 of the Punishment of Incest Act 1908

Section 11(1) replaced section 2 of the Punishment of Incest Act 1908

Section 11(2) replaced section 3 of the Punishment of Incest Act 1908

As a whole section 17 replaced sections 53 and 54 of the Offences against the Person Act 1861. Section 17(1) replaced section 54 of that Act.

Section 18 replaced section 53 of the Offences against the Person Act 1861

Section 19 replaced section 7 of the Criminal Law Amendment Act 1885

Section 20 replaced section 55 of the Offences against the Person Act 1861

Section 21 replaced section 56(1)(e) of the Mental Deficiency Act 1913

Section 22(1)(a) replaced section 2(2) of the Criminal Law Amendment Act 1885

Section 22(1)(b) replaced section 2(3) of the Criminal Law Amendment Act 1885 and section 2 of the Criminal Law Amendment Act 1912

Section 22(1)(c) replaced section 2(4) of the Criminal Law Amendment Act 1885, section 2 of the Criminal Law Amendment Act 1912 and section 1(b) of the Criminal Law Amendment Act 1951

Section 22(2) replaced the proviso to section 2 of the Criminal Law Amendment Act 1885

Section 23(1) replaced section 2(1) of the Criminal Law Amendment Act 1885 and section 1(a) of the Criminal Law Amendment Act 1951

Section 23(2) replaced the proviso to section 2 of the Criminal Law Amendment Act 1885

Section 24 replaced section 8 of the Criminal Law Amendment Act 1885

Section 25 replaced section 6(1) of the Criminal Law Amendment Act 1885

Section 26 replaced section 6(2) of the Criminal Law Amendment Act 1885

Section 27 replaced section 56(1)(d) of the Mental Deficiency Act 1913

Section 28(1) replaced section 2(1) of the Children and Young Persons Act 1933

Section 28(2) replaced section 2(2) of the Children and Young Persons Act 1933

Sections 28(3) and (4) replaced section 17 of the Children and Young Persons Act 1933

Section 28(5) replaced section 99(2) of the Children and Young Persons Act 1933

Section 29 replaced section 56(1)(c) of the Mental Deficiency Act 1913

Section 30(1) replaced section 1(1)(a) of the Vagrancy Act 1898 and sections 7(2) and (5) of the Criminal Law Amendment Act 1912

Section 30(2) replaced section 1(3) of the Vagrancy Act 1898 and section 7(1) of the Criminal Law Amendment Act 1912

Section 31 replaced section 7(4) of the Criminal Law Amendment Act 1912

Section 32 replaced section 1(1)(b) of the Vagrancy Act 1898 and sections 7(2) and (5) of the Criminal Law Amendment Act 1912

Section 33 replaced section 13(1) of the Criminal Law Amendment Act 1885

Section 34 replaced section 13(3) of the Criminal Law Amendment Act 1885

Section 35(1) and 36 replaced section 13(2) of the Criminal Law Amendment Act 1885

Sections 38 replaced section 1(4) of the Punishment of Incest Act 1908

Section 40 replaced section 1 of the Criminal Law Amendment Act 1912

Section 49(a) replaced section 2 of Criminal Law Amendment Act 1922

Section 49(b) replaced section 3 of Criminal Law Amendment Act 1922

Section 1
This section created the felony, and later offence, of rape.

Section 1(1) replaced section 48 of the Offences against the Person Act 1861.

Section 1(2) replaced the final paragraph of section 4 of the Criminal Law Amendment Act 1885.

Section 12
This section created the felony, and later offence, of buggery.

Section 12(1) replaced section 61 of the Offences against the Person Act 1861.

Section 12(2) replaced section 15 of the Children and Young Persons Act 1933.

Section 12(3) replaced section 99(2) of the Children and Young Persons Act 1933.

Section 13
This section created the offence of gross indecency between men.

Section 13 replaced section 11 of the Criminal Law Amendment Act 1885.

Section 14
This section created the offence of indecent assault on a woman.

Section 14(1) replaced section 52 of the Offences against the Person Act 1861.

Section 14(2) replaced section 1 of the Criminal Law Amendment Act 1922.

Section 14(3) replaced section 1 of the Age of Marriage Act 1929.

Section 14(4) replaced section 56(3) of the Mental Deficiency Act 1913.

Section 15
This section created the offence of indecent assault on a man.

Section 15(1) replaced section 62 of Offences against the Person Act 1861.

Section 15(2) replaced section 1 of the Criminal Law Amendment Act 1922.

Section 15(3) replaced section 56(3) of the Mental Deficiency Act 1913.

Section 15(4) replaced section 15 of the Children and Young Persons Act 1933.

Section 15(5) replaced section 99(2) of the Children and Young Persons Act 1933.

Section 16
This section created the offence of assault with intent to commit buggery.

Section 16(1) replaced section 62 of Offences against the Person Act 1861.

Section 16(2) replaced section 15 of the Children and Young Persons Act 1933.

Section 16(3) replaced section 99(2) of the Children and Young Persons Act 1933.

Section 44
See Sexual intercourse in English law.

Section 44 replaced section 63 of the Offences against the Person Act 1861.

See also
Sexual Offences Act
Prostitution in the United Kingdom
Transition from 1956 to 2003 laws

References

External links
Sections 33, 34, 35 and 36 of the Act, as in force today, from the UK Statute Law Database.
Section 33A (as inserted by section 55 of the Sexual Offences Act 2003).
Text of the whole Act, prior to 1 May 2004.

English criminal law
Sex crimes in the United Kingdom
United Kingdom Acts of Parliament 1956
Prostitution law in the United Kingdom